WDPN is an AM radio station in Alliance, Ohio, operating on 1310 kHz. The station airs a soft adult contemporary format. It is owned by the family company of Don Peterson who is the former publisher of The Alliance Review, and is co-owned with FM station WDJQ.

The station first signed on the air in 1953 as WFAH, originally owned by The Review Publishing Co., with D.A. Peterson as general manager.  On September 1, 1990, it became WDPN.

References

External links

DPN
Alliance, Ohio
Soft adult contemporary radio stations in the United States
Radio stations established in 1953
1953 establishments in Ohio